Fazilka Junction is located in Fazilka district in the Indian state of Punjab and serves Fazilka.

The railway station

History before Partition
The Southern Punjab Railway Co. opened the Delhi–Bhatinda–Fazilka-Bahawalpur-Samma Satta railway line in 1897. The line passed through Rohtak, Jind, Narwana, Bhatinda, Kot Kapura, Muktasar, Fazilka, Amruka & Bahawalnagar and provided direct connection through Samma Satta (now in Pakistan) to Karachi. The extension from the Macleodganj Junction (later renamed Mandi Sadiqganj Junction and now in Pakistan) railway line to Ambala via Hindumalkote, Abohar, Bhatinda, Patiala was opened by the same company in 1902.

The historical Bahawalpur Express train used to run from Delhi to Bahawalpur via Bhatinda, Fazilka & Samma Satta before partition, covering  in 14 hrs 30 mins time. Pre-1947 era Timings of Delhi-Samma Satta were as follows. 144 Down Bahawalpur Express used to depart Delhi at 15.25 hrs. Then going through Rohtak 16.44 hrs; Jind 17.42 hrs; Bhatinda 21.05 hrs; Fazilka 23.30 hrs; Amruka 23.59 hrs; McLeodganj 00.40 hrs; Bahawalnagar 01.45 hrs; Samma Satta 05.40 hrs(reversal); arriving Bahawalpur at 05.55 hrs next day. 143 Up Bahawalpur Express used to depart Bahawalpur at 19.00 hrs, then reversing at Samma Satta around 19.35 hrs, the train going via Fazilka at 01.30 hrs; Bhatinda at 04.00 hrs & used to reach Delhi at 09.30 hrs next day. The train now runs from Samma Satta to Narowal Junction via Bahawalpur-Lodhran-Multan-Khanewal-Lahore route through Pakistan post partition in 1947.

Post Partition
Post partition Fazilka lost rail connection to Delhi & only trains to Bhatinda used to run. The line was destroyed in 1965 & 1971 wars against Pakistan. But link between Fazilka & Abohar stayed unavailable until 2010. Fazilka-Abohar new line project was announced in 2010 & the  new  broad gauge line between Fazilka and Abohar was opened in 2012. But as of today, only 6 Mail/Express trains operate from Fazilka. Sadly, Indian railways is not introducing new trains from Fazilka & via Fazilka.

References

External links
 Trains at Fazilka

Railway stations in Fazilka district
Firozpur railway division